The South Carolina Gamecocks baseball team represents the University of South Carolina in NCAA Division I college baseball.  South Carolina has perennially been one of the best teams in college baseball since 1970, posting 33 NCAA Tournament appearances, 11 College World Series berths, 6 CWS Finals appearances and 2 National Championships: 2010 and 2011.  Carolina is one of six schools in NCAA history to win back-to-back titles.  Since joining the Southeastern Conference in 1992, the team has competed in the Eastern division.  South Carolina owns a stellar 32-20 record at the CWS, holds the NCAA record for consecutive wins (22) in the national tournament and the longest win streak ever at the CWS (12 in a row from 2010 to 2012) in which the Gamecocks played for national titles all three years.

The current head coach is Mark Kingston, with Chad Holbrook resigning on June 6, 2017. Holbrook took over for Ray Tanner, who was named athletics director at USC after the 2012 season. This follows a string of three consecutive appearances in the national championship series, including two consecutive national championships. During Tanner's stint as head coach, the Gamecocks also captured three SEC titles, one SEC tournament title, six division titles, six College World Series appearances, and 13 of their 15 straight NCAA Tournaments (longest streak in the SEC at the time).  Between 2010 and 2012 the Gamecocks set two NCAA records for postseason success: the most consecutive NCAA tournament wins (22) and the most consecutive wins in the College World Series (12).  In 2013, Carolina set the record for consecutive home NCAA tournament wins, with 29.  The team plays its home games at Founders Park, which opened on February 21, 2009.

Program history
South Carolina played its first intercollegiate game on May 2, 1895 against Wofford in Spartanburg after the faculty agreed to let the athletic teams travel outside of Columbia.  After decades of lackluster performance on the diamond, Carolina's fortunes quickly changed with the hiring of former New York Yankees second baseman Bobby Richardson in 1970.  Since then, the Gamecocks have been regular NCAA Tournament participants, making 31 Regional and 11 College World Series appearances.

Carolina owns a 32–20 all-time record at the College World Series and is 137–71 in NCAA Tournament play. Carolina holds the NCAA Tournament records for consecutive NCAA tournament wins (22), consecutive CWS wins (12), and consecutive home NCAA tournament wins (30). In 124 years of baseball, through 2016, Carolina has 2,533 wins, 1,508 losses, and 17 ties.

Bobby Richardson era (1970–1976)

Richardson led the Gamecocks to their first NCAA Tournament appearance in 1974, which set the stage for what would happen a year later.  In 1975, South Carolina posted a 51–6–1 record, made the College World Series and played for the National Title against Texas (5–1 Longhorns victory).  Richardson left South Carolina after the 1976 season, finishing his tenure with a 221–92–1 record and three NCAA Tournament appearances.

June Raines era (1977–1996)

June Raines took over the Gamecocks in 1977 and picked up where Richardson left off, leading the Gamecocks to a 43–12–1 record and its second National Title game appearance in three years (2–1 loss to Arizona State).  Raines led the Gamecocks to three more College World Series appearances by his final season in 1996, and he finished his tenure as the program's all-time winningest coach with a 763–380–2 overall record.  During the Raines' era, South Carolina made 11 NCAA Tournament appearances and posted nine 40-win seasons.  The 1980s saw the program's most successful run during Raines' tenure, as the Gamecocks made eight NCAA Tournaments, including seven straight from 1980–1986.

Ray Tanner era (1997–2012)

In 1997, Ray Tanner was hired and quickly built upon the winning tradition that Richardson created and Raines had perpetuated.  In 16 seasons as the Gamecocks' skipper, Tanner compiled a 734–313 (.701) record with six College World Series appearances including finishing as National runner-up in 2002 and 2012 while winning the 2010 and 2011 NCAA National Championships.  Under Tanner, the Gamecocks have made 14 NCAA Tournament appearances, advanced to the Super Regionals 10 times, and have posted fourteen 40-win and five 50-win seasons.  In addition, the Gamecocks won the 2000, 2002 and 2011 SEC regular season championships, the 2004 SEC Tournament Championship, and six SEC East titles (1999, 2000, 2002, 2003, 2011, 2012).  In 2010, Tanner and the Gamecocks won the NCAA Championship at the old Johnny "The Blatt" Rosenblatt Stadium in Omaha, becoming the first team to win six straight games in a College World Series and the third team to win the CWS after losing its first game of the series. In 2011, Coach Tanner led the Gamecocks to a share of the 2011 Regular Season SEC Championship before winning the 2011 NCAA National Championship at the new TD Ameritrade Park in Omaha.  Under Coach Tanner's guidance, South Carolina set the NCAA record for consecutive NCAA Tournament wins (22) and CWS wins (12) between 2010–2012, as the Gamecocks became just the sixth program to win back-to-back CWS titles. On July 13, 2012, Coach Tanner accepted the position of athletics director at USC, bringing his tenure as baseball head coach to a close.

Chad Holbrook era (2013–2017)
Chad Holbrook became head coach at the start of the 2013 season and began his career on February 15, 2013.  South Carolina defeated Liberty 4–3 on a day honoring Tanner. Carolina reached the NCAA tournament in 2013, 2014, & 2016, advancing to the Super Regionals during the 2013 and 2016 season. Holbrook resigned on June 6, 2017.

Mark Kingston era (2018–present)
Mark Kingston became head coach at the start of the 2018 season and began his career on February 16, 2018. In his first season, he led the Gamecocks to a Regional in which they won, going 3-0 in the Greenville (ECU) Regional.

2000's: SEC dominance and return to Omaha

In the 10 years from 2000–2009, South Carolina posted an impressive 468–201 overall record (179–120 SEC).  The 468 overall wins ranked fourth in Division I College Baseball (first among SEC programs), and the 179 SEC victories led the conference for the decade.  The Gamecocks made the NCAA Tournament every season, advancing to seven Super Regionals and three College World Series (first CWS berths since 1985).  In addition, South Carolina won 40 or more games each season and hit the 50-win mark on three occasions (2000, 2002, 2004).  The highlight of the decade was an appearance in the 2002 National Championship game against Texas, who defeated the Gamecocks by a score of 12–6.  The 2002 squad finished with a 57–18 mark, setting the record for most season victories in program history.

 2000–2004: Winningest Program in NCAA Division I – In the five seasons from 2000 to 2004, South Carolina won more games than any other Division I College Baseball program in the nation (260–87 record).  This stretch included five Super Regionals, three College World Series berths, three 50-win seasons, a 99–50 SEC record, three SEC championships (2 season and 1 tournament), and three SEC East titles.

South Carolina won eight SEC series to finish 21–9 in regular season conference play (2nd place), but posted an 0–2 mark in the SEC Tournament.  Once the NCAA Tournament began, however, the Gamecocks rode strong pitching and clutch hitting to win their Regional and Super Regional and earn a berth in the College World Series.  After an opening game loss to Oklahoma, South Carolina reeled off four straight victories to reach the championship series against UCLA.  The Gamecocks continued their hot streak, defeating the Bruins in consecutive games (7–1 and 2–1) to win the 2010 National Championship.  South Carolina finished the season with a 54–16 overall record, which included an 11–1 mark in NCAA postseason play. South Carolina was the final team to win the CWS Championship in Johnny Rosenblatt Stadium, and Gamecock center fielder Jackie Bradley Jr. was named CWS Most Outstanding Player.

2010 National Championship

South Carolina won eight SEC series to finish 21–9 in regular season conference play (2nd place), but posted an 0–2 mark in the SEC Tournament.  Once the NCAA Tournament began, however, the Gamecocks rode strong pitching and clutch hitting to win their Regional and Super Regional and earn a berth in the College World Series.  After an opening game loss to Oklahoma, South Carolina reeled off four straight victories to reach the championship series against UCLA. Just as in 2002, the Gamecocks had to defeat arch rival Clemson twice (5-1 & 4-3) to reach the tournament finals against heavily favored UCLA. The Gamecocks continued their hot streak, defeating the Bruins in consecutive games (7–1 and 2–1) to win the 2010 National Championship.  South Carolina finished the season with a 54–16 overall record, which included an 11–1 mark in NCAA postseason play. South Carolina was the final team to win the CWS Championship in Johnny Rosenblatt Stadium, and Gamecock center fielder Jackie Bradley Jr. was named CWS Most Outstanding Player. This marked the University's first major athletic national championship.

2011 National Championship

South Carolina finished the 2011 regular season 44–12 (22–8 SEC) and shared the SEC regular season championship with divisional rivals Florida and Vanderbilt, but posted a 1–2 mark in the SEC Tournament in Hoover, Alabama despite their #1 overall seeding.  Once the NCAA Tournament began, however, the Gamecocks rode strong pitching, clutch hitting and incredible defense while cruising through their Regional and Super Regional, without a loss, on their way to a second consecutive berth in the College World Series.  South Carolina proceeded to defeat Texas A&M 5–4 in their first game, then swept #1 national seed Virginia (7–1 and 3–2) in the next two, including a 13-inning win in the second matchup, to battle their way back to the CWS Championship Series versus SEC Eastern Division foe Florida. This marked the second time two teams from the SEC had participated in the Championship Series/Games. In Game 1 of the Championship Series, South Carolina lived up to their mantra as they battled to win their second straight extra inning game in the CWS, 2–1 over the Gators, in 11 innings. They had a much easier time with the favored Gators in Game 2, winning 5–2 to earn the 2011 CWS Championship and their second consecutive national title. The Gamecock defense turned an incredible nine double-plays in this CWS – no other participant turned more than three.  South Carolina finished the season with a 55–14 overall record, setting a new NCAA record for consecutive post-season wins with 16, a new record for consecutive College World Series wins with 11, and became the just the sixth program in history to win back-to-back NCAA Division I Baseball Championships. Carolina became the first team to win the College World Series in the new TD Ameritrade Park, and Gamecock second baseman Scott Wingo was named CWS Most Outstanding Player.

National runner-up seasons
 1975 – The 1975 Gamecocks won four games at the College World Series behind strong starting pitching, but were ultimately defeated twice by the Texas Longhorns.  In the title game, Texas defeated South Carolina 5–1.  The Gamecocks finished the season with a 51–6–1 record.
 1977 – Just two years after finishing #2 nationally, the Gamecocks returned to Omaha in 1977.  South Carolina rode solid pitching to three victories, before losing twice to Arizona State.  In the title game, the Sun Devils defeated the Gamecocks 2–1.  South Carolina finished the season with a 43–12–1 record.
 2002 – The Gamecocks returned to the CWS in 2002 after not reaching Omaha since 1985.  After an 11–0 loss to Georgia Tech, the Gamecocks reeled off four straight victories, including two against arch-rival Clemson. This began a streak of four straight wins (including 2010) over Clemson in Omaha's College World Series- where the Gamecocks have never lost to the Tigers. Texas defeated South Carolina 12–6 in the national championship game. The Gamecocks finished the season with a 54–16 record.
 2012 – The Gamecocks made it back to the CWS championship series in 2012 after winning the National Championship in 2010 and 2011 with a #8 national seed. After defeating the #1 overall seed in the NCAA tournament in Florida, the Gamecocks followed with victories over Kent State and Arkansas. The Gamecocks were eliminated 2–0 by the Arizona Wildcats in the National Championship series. The Gamecocks finished the season with a 49 – 20 record.

50-Win seasons
 1975 – The Gamecocks went 51–6–1, won the NCAA Atlantic Regional, and finished National Runner-up to Texas at the College World Series.
 2000 – The Gamecocks went 56–10 overall (25–5 SEC), won the SEC season championship, and reached the Super Regionals.
 2002 – The Gamecocks went 57–18 overall (21–8 SEC), won the SEC season championship, and finished National Runner-up to Texas at the College World Series.
 2004 – The Gamecocks went 53–17 overall (17–13 SEC), won the SEC tournament championship, and reached the College World Series.
 2010 – The Gamecocks went 54–16 overall (21–9 SEC), reached the College World Series, and defeated UCLA in the championship series to win their first National Title.
 2011 – The Gamecocks went 55–14 overall (22–8 SEC), won a share of the SEC East and season titles, and defeated SEC rival Florida to win their second straight National Championship.

Head coaches and all-time results

Program achievements

 Super Regional play was implemented by the NCAA in 1999.

Awards
 Golden Spikes Award – Kip Bouknight (2000)
 Collegiate Baseball Player of the Year Award – Kip Bouknight (2000)
 College World Series MVP – Jackie Bradley Jr. (2010), Scott Wingo (2011)
 National Coach of the Year – Ray Tanner (2000, 2010, 2011)
 National Assistant Coach of the Year – Jim Toman (2002), Chad Holbrook (2011)
 SEC H. Boyd McWhorter Scholar-Athlete of the Year – Trey Dyson (2002), Michael Roth (2012)
 SEC Player of the Year – Kip Bouknight (2000), Yaron Peters (2002)
 SEC Pitcher of the Year – David Marchbanks (2003)
 SEC Coach of the Year – Ray Tanner (1998, 2000, 2011)
 Lefty Gomez Award for Best Pitcher in College Baseball- Randy Martz (1977)

South Carolina's 1st Team All-Americans

Notable players

Gamecocks in Major League Baseball

As of 2021, 59 former Gamecocks have seen action in the Major Leagues. Six players were active for more than 10 seasons: Brian Roberts (14), Steve Pearce (13), Dave Hollins (12), Mookie Wilson (12), Adam Everett (11), Justin Smoak (11).

In the 2018 World Series, former Gamecock Steve Pearce won the 2018 World Series Most Valuable Player Award as he led the Boston Red Sox to their 9th World Series title in Franchise history. Jackie Bradley Jr. won the 2018 ALCS MVP.

During the 2021 season, there have been eleven active players on MLB rosters:
 Jordan Montgomery – New York Yankees
 Clarke Schmidt – New York Yankees 
 Whit Merrifield – Kansas City Royals
 Jackie Bradley Jr. – Milwaukee Brewers
 Christian Walker – Arizona Diamondbacks
 Tyler Webb – St. Louis Cardinals
 Grayson Greiner – Detroit Tigers
 Wil Crowe – Pittsburgh Pirates
 Max Schrock – Cincinnati Reds
 Taylor Widener – Arizona Diamondbacks
 Heath Hembree – Cleveland Indians

Gamecocks who are World Series champions
 Mookie Wilson – 1986
 Steve Pearce – 2018 World Series MVP
 Jackie Bradley Jr. – 2018. 2018 American League Championship Series MVP

Gamecock Olympians
 Adam Everrett – SS in 2000
 Ray Tanner  – Assistant Coach in 1996, 2000

Gamecocks in Team USA
 Dave Hollins – 3B in 1986
 Brian Williams – P in 1989
 Jared Baker – P in 1991
 Jason Haynie – P in 1993, 1994
 Adam Everett – SS in 1997
 Landon Powell – C in 2002
 Matt Campbell – P in 2003
 Justin Smoak – 1B in 2007
 Jackie Bradley Jr. – OF in 2010
  Grayson Greiner – C in 2013
 Ray Tanner – Head Coach in 2003

See also
 List of NCAA Division I baseball programs

References

External links